Magnetized liner inertial fusion (MagLIF) is an emerging method of producing controlled nuclear fusion. It is part of the broad category of inertial fusion energy (IFE) systems, which drives the inward movement of fusion fuel, thereby compressing it to reach densities and temperatures where fusion reactions occur. Previous IFE experiments used laser drivers to reach these conditions, whereas MagLIF uses a combination of lasers for heating and Z-pinch for compression. A variety of theoretical considerations suggest such a system will reach the required conditions for fusion with a machine of significantly less complexity than the pure-laser approach. There are currently at least two facilities testing feasibility of the MagLIF concept, the Z-machine at Sandia Labs in the US and Primary Test Stand (PTS) located in Mianyang, China.

Description
MagLIF is a method of generating energy by using a 100 nanosecond pulse of electricity to create an intense Z-pinch magnetic field that inwardly crushes a fuel filled cylindrical metal liner (a hohlraum) through which the electric pulse runs. Just before the cylinder implodes, a laser is used to preheat fusion fuel (such as deuterium–tritium) that is held within the cylinder and contained by a magnetic field. Sandia National Labs is currently exploring the potential for this method to generate energy by utilizing the Z machine.

MagLIF has characteristics of both inertial confinement fusion (due to the usage of a laser and pulsed compression) and magnetic confinement (due to the utilization of a powerful magnetic field to inhibit thermal conduction and contain the plasma). In results published in 2012, a LASNEX based computer simulation of a 70 megaampere facility showed the prospect of a spectacular energy return of 1000 times the expended energy. A 60 MA facility would produce a 100× yield. The currently available facility at Sandia, Z machine, is capable of 27 MA and may be capable of producing slightly more than breakeven energy while helping to validate the computer simulations.  The Z-machine conducted MagLIF experiments in November 2013 with a view towards breakeven experiments using D–T fuel in 2018.

Sandia Labs planned to proceed to ignition experiments after establishing the following:

 That the liner will not break apart too quickly under the intense energy. This has been apparently confirmed by recent experiments. This hurdle was the biggest concern regarding MagLIF following its initial proposal.
 That laser preheating is able to correctly heat the fuel—to be confirmed by experiments starting in December 2012.
 That magnetic fields generated by a pair of coils above and below the hohlraum can serve to trap the preheated fusion fuel and importantly inhibit thermal conduction without causing the target to buckle prematurely—to be confirmed by experiments starting in December 2012.

Following these experiments, an integrated test started in November 2013. The test yielded about 1010 high-energy neutrons.

As of November 2013, the facility at Sandia labs had the following capabilities: 
 10 tesla magnetic field
 2 kJ laser
 16 MA
 D–D fuel

In 2014, the test yielded up to  D–D neutrons under the following conditions: 
 10 tesla magnetic field
 2.5 kJ laser
 19 MA
 D–D fuel

Experiments aiming for energy breakeven with D-T fuel were expected to occur in 2018.

To achieve scientific breakeven, the facility is going through a 5-year upgrade to:
 30 teslas
 8 kJ laser
 27 MA
 D–T fuel handling

In 2019, after encountering significant problems related to mixing of imploding foil with fuel and helical instability of plasma, the tests yielded up to 3.2×1012 neutrons under the following conditions:
 1.2 kJ laser
 18 MA

See also

 National Ignition Facility
 Nuclear fusion
 Z-pinch

References

Inertial confinement fusion